Krempna  (Krampna) is a village in Jasło County, Subcarpathian Voivodeship, in south-eastern Poland, close to the border with Slovakia. It is the seat of the gmina (administrative district) called Gmina Krempna.

The village has a population of 500.

References

Villages in Jasło County